Nucleoporin 37 (Nup37) is a protein that in humans is encoded by the NUP37 gene.

Function 
Transport of macromolecules between the cytoplasm and nucleus occurs through nuclear pore complexes (NPCs) embedded in the nuclear envelope. NPCs are composed of subcomplexes, and NUP37 is part of one such subcomplex, Nup107-160.

References

Nuclear pore complex